The Misfortunes of an Explorer is a 1900 French short silent film by Georges Méliès.

Plot
Entering an underground tomb, an English explorer comes across a sarcophagus. From it appears a ghost, which turns into a goddess angry at the explorer's infiltration. The goddess summons up three Ancient Egyptian monsters, which attack the explorer and trap him inside the sarcophagus, which the goddess magically sets on fire. She then stops the fire, and the explorer stumbles out and is chased away.

Release

Méliès played the explorer in the film, which was released by his Star Film Company and numbered 244 in its catalogues.

A very brief fragment of the film (about 10 to 20 seconds, depending on frame rate) is known to exist, and has been released on home video and film festival prints. The fragment shows the explorer entering, discovering the sarcophagus, and stepping inside.

References

External links

1900 films
French silent short films
French black-and-white films
Films directed by Georges Méliès